The 1987–88 Soviet Cup was a cup competition of the Soviet Union. The winner of the competition, Metallist Kharkov, qualified for the continental tournament.

Competition schedule

First preliminary round
All games took place on June 6, 1987.

Second preliminary round

Round of 32

Round of 16
First leg games all took place on September 12, 1987, while most second leg games were played from September 30–October 3.

Quarter-finals
All games were scheduled to take place on April 29, 1988.

Semi-finals

Final

External links
 Complete calendar

Soviet Cup seasons
Cup
Cup
Soviet Cup